is a city located in Fukushima Prefecture, Japan. , the city had an estimated population of 35,702 in 12,821 households and a population density of 78 persons per km².

Geography
Tamura is located in east-central Fukushima Prefecture, in the easternmost portion of the Nakadōri region of then prefecture. The town is located in a hilly region of the Abukuma Mountains.

Neighboring municipalities
 Fukushima Prefecture
Nihonmatsu
Kōriyama
Iwaki
Miharu
Ono
Kawauchi
Ōkuma 
Namie
Katsurao

Climate
Tamura has a humid continental climate (Köppen Cfa) characterized by mild summers and cold winters with heavy snowfall.  The average annual temperature in Tamura is 10.4 °C. The average annual rainfall is 1368 mm with September as the wettest month. The temperatures are highest on average in August, at around 23.1 °C, and lowest in January, at around -0.1 °C.

Demographics
Per Japanese census data, the population of Tamura has declined steadily over the past 60 years.

History
The area of present-day Tamura was part of ancient Mutsu Province. Much of the area was part of Miharu Domain under the Edo period Tokugawa shogunate. After the Meiji Restoration, the area was organized as part of Tamura District in Iwaki Province. The villages of Miyakoji, Tokiwa, Katasone, Takine, and Ōgoe were established with the creation of the modern municipalities system on April 1, 1889. Tokiwa was elevated to town status on July 1, 1898, and the village of Katasone became the town of Funehiki on April 1, 1934. Takine was elevated to town status of April 1, 1940 followed by Ōgoe on February 8, 1942. The city of Tamura was established on March 1, 2005, from the merger of these four towns and one village.

Evacuation after the Fukushima Daiichi Nuclear Disaster
After the Fukushima Daiichi Nuclear Disaster on 11 March 2011, the area containing the former village of Miyakoji was evacuated. On 1 April 2012 residents were allowed to return during daytime hours as decontamination work progressed. The evacuation order was lifted on 1 April 2014. However, doubts remain as to the effectiveness of the radiation decontamination efforts.

Government
Tamura has a mayor-council form of government with a directly elected mayor and a unicameral city legislature of 20 members. Tamura, together with Tamura District contribute two members to the Fukushima Prefectural Assembly. In terms of national politics, the city is part of Fukushima 3rd district of the lower house of the Diet of Japan.

Economy
The economy of Tamura is primarily agricultural. Rice, beef and dairy cattle, and vegetable production predominates. The area is also known for its bottled mineral water and sake rice wine.

Education
Tamura has 16 public elementary schools and seven public junior high school operated by the city government, and one public high school operated by the Fukushima Board of Education.
Fukushima Prefectural Funehiki High School

Transportation

Railway
JR East – Ban'etsu East Line
  -  -  -  -  -

Highway

International relations
 Mansfield, Ohio, United States, since October 21, 2000

Local attractions

 Abukuma Limestone Caves
 Hoshi no Mura ("Village of Stars") Observatory
Okaburaya Shrine
Ohtakadoyayama Transmitter is an LF-time signal transmitter in Miyakoji-machi. It is used for transmitting the time signal JJY on 40 kHz. It uses as transmission antenna a 250 metre tall guyed mast with an umbrella antenna, which is insulated against ground.

Noted people from Tamura
Hiroyuki Arai, politician
Kōichirō Genba, politician

References

External links

Official Website 	
JJY at Tamura

 
Cities in Fukushima Prefecture